Thomas Franklin "Tom" Gayford (born November 21, 1928) is a retired Canadian equestrian. He was educated at the University of Toronto Schools. He competed at the 1952 and 1960 Olympics in the individual and team three-day events, but failed to finish. At the 1968 Olympics he won a gold medal in show jumping with the Canadian team. 

Gayford is the son of Gordon Gayford, who competed internationally in horse riding. He was a member of the Canadian Equestrian Team for show jumping from the late 1940s through the early 1970s, winning team gold medals at the 1968 Olympics, 1970 World Championships and 1971 Pan American Games, and placing third at the 1967 Pan American Games. He also won a team gold medal in the three-day event at the 1959 Pan American Games. Individually he won the New York International Horse Show three times. Gayford retired before the 1972 Olympics to become an equestrian coach, judge, and course designer. He designed the jumping course at the 1976 Summer Olympics in Montreal, and headed the Canadian national jumping team from 1978 through 1996. He was inducted into the Canada's Sports Hall of Fame in 1968 and to the Canadian Olympic Hall of Fame in 1971.

References

External links
Portrait of Thomas Gayford in the Canadian Sports Hall of Fame archive
Photo of Gayford riding in the Canadian Sports Hall of Fame archive

Living people
Canadian male equestrians
1928 births
Sportspeople from Toronto
Olympic equestrians of Canada
Equestrians at the 1952 Summer Olympics
Equestrians at the 1960 Summer Olympics
Equestrians at the 1968 Summer Olympics
Olympic gold medalists for Canada
Olympic medalists in equestrian
Medalists at the 1968 Summer Olympics
Pan American Games medalists in equestrian
Pan American Games gold medalists for Canada
Pan American Games bronze medalists for Canada
Competitors at the 1959 Pan American Games
Equestrians at the 1967 Pan American Games
Equestrians at the 1971 Pan American Games
Medalists at the 1959 Pan American Games
Medalists at the 1967 Pan American Games
Medalists at the 1971 Pan American Games
20th-century Canadian people
21st-century Canadian people